Yuichiro Ando (born 1959) is a Japanese-American painter, video artist, and documentary film maker. He was born in Tokyo, Japan.

Life 
Ando moved to the U.S. in 1980. He studied at the Otis Art Institute of Parsons School of Design where he earned his BFA. He also attended graduate school at UC Irvine School of Fine Arts and received his MFA. He has received several awards since.

In 1997 Ando worked on a major documentary project on hemophiliacs and HIV. The documentary he produced resulted in a $100 million lawsuit by pharmaceutical companies. This event led him to quit producing documentaries and he concentrated on his artworks.

References 
 Ando web site
 Artist Space NY, NY
 Yahoo TV
 Downtown Artist

1959 births
20th-century American painters
American male painters
Expressionist painters
Japanese painters
Living people
20th-century American male artists